Drymaeus branneri is a species of  tropical air-breathing land snail, a pulmonate gastropod mollusk in the family Bulimulidae.

Distribution 
The type locality of Drymaeus branneri is above Porto Velho along the Madeira-Mamoré railroad (= ca. 260 km South-West of Porto Velho), Rondônia, Brazil.

 Brazil
 Peru - first report in 2010.

References

Drymaeus
Gastropods described in 1914